Everyman is a 1964 Australian TV play. It screened on the ABC and was directed by Christopher Muir, who filmed the whole script.

It was part of the ABC's Christmas programming.

Plot
A pilgrim introduces the story. Death comes to summon Everyman, and Everyman is afraid to go on the journey alone. He tries to negotiate with Death. He realises that except for his Good Deeds, he must face Death alone.

Cast
Kevin Colson as Everyman
Wynn Roberts as Death
Norman Kaye as Discretion
Patricia Kennedy as Knowledge
Beverly Dunn as Good Deeds
Peter Aanensen as Fellowship
James Lynch as Strength
Anne Charleston as Beauty
Gerda Nicholson as Cousin
Stewart Weller as Goods
Bruce Barry as Kindred
Syd Conabere as Confession
Laurence Beck as Five Wits
Rex Holdsworth as a pilgrim

Production
It was based on a medieval play from an unknown author. The play was often performed in Cathedrals.

Some scenes were shot at St Patrick's Cathedral in Melbourne.

References

External links

1960s Australian television plays
1964 television plays